The 2003–04 season, was the Guildford Flames' twelfth year of ice hockey. The Guildford Flames competed in the British National League.

Coach Stan Marple brought in six Slovaks who would help the Flames to their most successful British National League season for three years. Milos Melicherik, Rastislav Palov and Jozef Kohut were the forwards, with Marian Smerciak and Peter Michnac on defence. Completing the Slovak crew later on was Edinburgh Capitals' leading scorer, Peter Konder.

Apart from Paul Dixon, Tony Redmond and Rick Plant, Marple made a clean sweep of his squad. In came Canadian forwards Ryan Vince from the ECHL's Dayton Bombers and Domenic Parlatore.

Rounding out the club were three GB internationals: netminder Stevie Lyle, defenceman Neil Liddiard and forward Nick Cross from Basingstoke Bison.

Player statistics

Netminders

Schedule and results

Challenge matches

British National League 
Final Standings

British National League play-offs 
The top six league clubs competed in the playoffs in a double round-robin tournament played over three weeks after the end of the regular league season.

The top four teams after the first round progressed into the semi-finals with the first-placed team playing the fourth and the second against the third, home and away, with the teams finishing first and second in the round-robin stage having a choice of the home date.

The final was also played over home and away legs, the team finishing highest in the league receiving the choice of the home date.

The playoff winner received the John Brady Bowl, named in memory of the former manager of Kirkcaldy ice rink who was influential in creating the league.

Quarter-Final Standings

Findus Cup 
All British National League teams were eligible to compete in the qualifying round of the competition. After each team played each other home and away, the top four teams were drawn into the semi-finals, which were played over two legs. The final and third place playoff were one-game contests played at the Newcastle Arena.

Qualifying Round Standings

End of Season Awards 
 Player of the Year – Milos Melicherik
 Player's Player of the Year – Ryan Vince
 Best British Player of the Year – Paul Dixon
 Most Sportsmanlike Player of the Year – Paul Dixon
 Top Points Scorer – Milos Melicherik

References

External links 
 Official Guildford Flames website

Guildford Flames seasons
2003–04 in English ice hockey